Listerin E3 ubiquitin protein ligase 1 (LTN1), otherwise known as listerin, is a protein that in humans is encoded by the LTN1 gene.

Function 

Like most RING finger proteins, listerin functions as an E3 ubiquitin ligase. Listerin is a component of the ribosome quality control complex.

References

Further reading